Rhodoluna is a Gram-positive, non-spore-forming and non-motile genus of bacteria from the family of Microbacteriaceae. The type strain of the only species Rhodoluna lacicola encodes an actinorhodopsin, which is a light-diven proton pump enabling light energy conversion, potentially resulting in a mixotrophic physiology. The type strain of R. lacicola was isolated from Lake Tai (Lake Taihu) in China. The type strain MWH-Ta8 is remarkable for its very small cell size ultramicrobacterium and its small genome size of only 1.4 Mbp. The type strain has a planktonic lifestyle, that is freely floating the water column of aquatic systems.
Currently, the genus Rhodoluna contains two described species (R. lacicola and R. limnophila).

References

Microbacteriaceae
Bacteria genera
Bacteria described in 2014